Belair Stud was an American thoroughbred horse racing stable and breeding farm founded by Provincial Governor of Maryland Samuel Ogle in 1747 in Collington, Prince George's County, Maryland, in Colonial America.

Colonial period

Queen Mab and Spark were the first pair of English-bred Thoroughbred horses imported to the Province of Maryland. Frederick Calvert, 6th Baron Baltimore, gave Spark to Ogle by during Ogle's trip to England in 1740; the Prince of Wales presented the gift to Ogle. Later, Benjamin Tasker Jr., brought Selima to Belair, where she became a prominent producer.

The Woodward Family
In 1898 the property was sold to the wealthy New York City banker James T. Woodward. who built large new stables in 1907. On his death his will bequeathed the property to his nephew, William Woodward Sr., who built Belair Stud and Stable into the preeminent United States racing and breeding operation during the 1930s, 1940s and 1950s.

During World War I, American horsemen were able to purchase well-bred foals from French breeders who could not afford to feed them during the extremely difficult war years. Some were bought directly by breeders while many were purchased by brokers who immediately resold them in America at the various Thoroughbred auctions. As such, William Woodward Sr. was able to build his broodmare band on French imports.

Under William Woodward Sr., the farm produced some of the greatest thoroughbred racehorses in the United States. He was part of a syndicate of breeders who purchased Sir Gallahad III in France and brought him to America. Some of Woodward's most famous horses were Gallant Fox and Omaha, the only father-and-son horses ever to win the U.S. Triple Crown of Thoroughbred Racing.

Record
In 1752, Selima won the biggest prize of the era, 2,500 pistoles at Gloucester, Virginia, which marked "the beginning of the remarkable racing contests between the rival colonies of Maryland and Virginia."

From 1923 to 1953, Belair Stud horses won 631 races, were second 568 times, and were third 540 times. Included in their victories were numerous important stakes races, and five of their horses were voted into the National Museum of Racing and Hall of Fame. Under trainer Sunny Jim Fitzsimmons, the stable won the following prestigious U.S. Triple Crown races:
Kentucky Derby:
1930 : Gallant Fox
1935 : Omaha
1939 : Johnstown
Preakness Stakes:
1930 : Gallant Fox
1935 : Omaha
1955 : Nashua
Belmont Stakes:
1930 : Gallant Fox
1932 : Faireno
1935 : Omaha
1936 : Granville
1939 : Johnstown
1955 : Nashua

See also
 Belair Mansion
 Belair Stable Museum

References

Further reading

American racehorse owners and breeders
Owners of Kentucky Derby winners
Breeders of Kentucky Derby winners
Owners of Preakness Stakes winners
Breeders of Preakness Stakes winners
Owners of Belmont Stakes winners
Breeders of Belmont Stakes winners
Owners of U.S. Thoroughbred Triple Crown winners
Breeders of U.S. Thoroughbred Triple Crown winners
Horse farms in Maryland
Prince George's County, Maryland